Begum Rokeya Padak, named after Begum Rokeya, is a Bangladeshi national honour conferred on individual women for their exceptional achievement. The award is given by the Ministry of Women and Children Affairs of the Government of Bangladesh. The award recognises the pioneering contribution of an individual in empowering women and raising women's issues.

Each awardee receives a gold medal weighing 25 grams of 18-karat gold, a certificate of honour, and a sum of cash. The amount of the cash reward was tk 2,00,000 from May 2017. Next it was increased to tk 4,00,000 from November 2019.

Award winners 
As of December 2020, 61 awards had been presented:
 1995 – Shamsunnahar Mahmud
 1996 – Sufia Kamal and Nilima Ibrahim
 1997 – Nurjahan Begum
 1999 – Angela Gomes and  Setara Begum (Rahman)
 2001 – Hena Das, Maliha Khatun and Beggzadi Mahmuda Nasir
 2002 – Akhtar Imam and Zohra Begum Kazi
 2003 – Taiyaba Majumder and Maleka Ashraf
 2004 – Begum Husna Banu Khanam and Dilara Chowdhury
 2005 – Rokeya Mannan
 2007 – Latifa Akand and Hosne Ara Begum
 2008 – Sultana Sarwat Ara Zaman and Nasrin Parvin Huq (posthumous)
 2009 – Razia Hossain and Mamtaz Hossen
 2010 – Meher Kabir and Ayesha Zafar
 2011 – Begum Meherunnesa Khatun and  Hamida Khanam
 2012 – Mahfuza Khanam and Syeda Jebunnesa Haque
 2013 – Hamida Banu and Jharna Dhara Chowdhury
 2014 – Mamtaz Begum and Golap Banu
 2015 – Bibi Russell and Taibun Nahar Rashid (posthumous)
 2016 – Aroma Dutta and Begum Noorjahan
 2017 – Mazeda Shawkat Ali, Baby Maudud (posthumous), Suraiya Rahman, Shobha Rani Tripura and Masuda Faruk Ratna
 2018 – Zinnatunnessa Talukdar, Zohra Anis, Shila Roy, Rama Chowdhury (posthumous) and Rokeya Begum (posthumous)
 2019 – Begum Selina Khalek, Shamsun Nahar, Papri Basu, Begum Akhtar Jahan and Nurun Nahar Faizannesa (posthumously).
 2020 – Shireen Akhter, Brig Gen Nazma Begum, Monjulika Chakma, Begum Mushtari Shafi, and Farida Akter
 2021 – Hasina Zakaria Bela, Archana Biswas, Shamsunnahar Rahman Paran (posthumous), Zinat Huda and Saria Sultana
 2022 – Rahima Khatun, Kamrun Nahar Begum, Farida Yasmin, Afroza Parveen, and Nasima Begum.

See also

 List of awards for contributions to society
 List of awards honoring women

References 

Women in Bangladesh
Civil awards and decorations of Bangladesh
Awards established in 1995
Awards for contributions to society
Orders, decorations, and medals for women

Begum Rokeya